The Defeat COVID-19 Ad Hoc Committee is an ad hoc committee of the Philippine House of Representatives.

Background
The ad hoc committee was first proposed on March 16, 2020 by Speaker Alan Peter Cayetano serving as an advisory and coordinating committee which will harmonize and streamline the government efforts in response to the pandemic.

On March 24, 2020, its creation was formally proposed by Cayetano during the approval on the third and final reading of House Bill No. 6616 which would later become the Bayanihan to Heal as One Act (Republic Act No. 11469). Majority Floor Leader Ferdinand Martin Romualdez then moved to select Cayetano as the committee chairperson of which the latter accepted. Cayetano likewise appointed Romualdez as a committee co-chairperson.

Jurisdiction 
The committee's jurisdiction is on the appropriate government response on the COVID-19 pandemic and how to curb its effects on the economy and the general public especially the labor force.

Members and sub-committees

New Normal Sub-Committee 
The New Normal Sub-Committee is composed of the following existing House committees:

 Micro, Small and Medium Enterprise Development
 Disaster Management
 Higher and Technical Education
 Trade and Industry
 Transportation
 Basic Education and Culture
 Labor and Employment
 Government Reorganization
 Public Information
 Local Government
 Civil Service and Professional Regulation
 Good Government and Public Accountability
 Revision of Laws
 Information and Communications Technology
 Inter-Parliamentary Relations and Diplomacy
 Foreign Affairs
 Appropriations

Health and COVID-19 Response Sub-Committee 
The Health and COVID-19 Response Sub-Committee is composed of the following existing House committees:

 Health
 Science and Technology

Social Amelioration Sub-Committee 
The Social Amelioration Sub-Committee is composed of the following existing House committees:

 Agrarian Reform
 Agriculture and Food
 Aquaculture and Fisheries Resources
 Cooperatives Development
 Natural Resources
 Rural Development
 Veterans Affairs and Welfare
 Overseas Workers Affairs
 Poverty Alleviation
 Social Services
 Welfare of Children
 Women and Gender Equality
 Youth and Sports Development
 People Participation
 Food Security
 Land Use
 Persons with Disabilities
 Senior Citizens

Economic Stimulus Response Package Sub-Committee 
The Economic Stimulus Response Package Sub-Committee is composed of the following existing House committees:

 Economic Affairs
 Public Works and Highways
 Government Enterprises and Privatization
 Sustainable Development Goals
 Metro Manila Development
 Games and Amusements
 Ways and Means
 Climate Change
 Visayas Development
 Tourism
 Energy
 Banks and Financial Intermediaries
 Flagship Programs and Projects
 Globalization and WTO
 Southern Tagalog Development
 Bicol Recovery and Economic Development
 North Luzon Growth Quadrangle
 Bases Conversion
 Reforestation
 East ASEAN Growth Area

Peace and Order Sub-Committee 
The Peace and Order Sub-Committee is composed of the following existing House committees:

 Accounts
 National Defense and Security
 Public Order and Safety
 Ecology
 Housing and Urban Development
 Population and Family Relations
 Constitutional Amendments
 Ethics and Privileges
 Justice
 Legislative Franchises
 Public Accounts
 Suffrage and Electoral Reforms
 Dangerous Drugs
 Human Rights
 Mindanao Affairs
 Muslim Affairs
 Indigenous Cultural Communities and Indigenous Peoples
 Peace, Reconciliation and Unity
 Strategic Intelligence
 West Philippine Sea

Approved bills 
The following bills have been referred to the committee and already approved by the House of Representatives on the third and final reading:

See also 
 House of Representatives of the Philippines
 List of Philippine House of Representatives committees
 COVID-19 pandemic in the Philippines
 Bayanihan to Heal as One Act
 Bayanihan to Recover as One Act

Notes

References

External links 
 House of Representatives of the Philippines

Committees of the House of Representatives of the Philippines
COVID-19 pandemic in the Philippines
National responses to the COVID-19 pandemic
2020 establishments in the Philippines